The ITU terrestrial model for one terminal in woodland is a radio propagation model belonging to the class of foliage models. This model is a successor of the early ITU model.

Applicable to/under conditions

Applicable to the scenario where one terminal of a link is inside foliage and the other end is free.

Coverage

Frequency: below 5 GHz
Depth of foliage: unspecified

Mathematical formulation

The mathematical formulation of the model is:

Where,

Av = Attenuation due to vegetation. Unit: decibel (dB)

A = Maximum attenuation for one terminal caused by a certain foliage. Unit: decibel (dB)

d = Depth of Foliage along the path. Unit: Meter(m)

 = Specific attenuation for short vegetations. Unit: decibel/meter (dB/m)

Points to note

The model assumes that exactly one of the terminals is located inside some forest or plantation and the term depth applies to the distance from the terminal inside the plantation to the end of plantation along the link.

See also
Early ITU model
Weissberger's model
Single vegetative obstruction model

Further reading
 Introduction to RF propagation, John S. Seybold, 2005, John Wiley and Sons.

Radio frequency propagation model